To Live and Die in L.A. is an investigative and true crime podcast hosted by American journalist Neil Strauss, and produced by Tenderfoot TV and Cadence13. Season 1 of the podcast follows the disappearance and death of aspiring Albanian Macedonian actress Adea Shabani, who was last seen alive leaving her Hollywood apartment with her boyfriend, Chris Spotz. Strauss works alongside private investigator Jayden Brant and producer Alex Vespestad to uncover the truth. In season 2, the focus shifts to the disappearance of California native Elaine Park, who went missing in 2017. Strauss again teams up with Brant, plus Incubus guitarist Michael Einziger, concert violinist Ann Marie Simpson, and Strauss's then-wife and author Ingrid De La O, who first introduced Strauss to Park's case.

History

Days after she went missing, Shabani's family asked Strauss, a journalist for Rolling Stone who lives in Los Angeles, if he would write an article covering the case that could draw attention to her disappearance. Throughout his research, Strauss uncovered several suspects and determined that one story would not be enough to express the details of the case, which led him to creating the podcast. While Strauss was investigating Shabani’s case, he was also investigating Park’s disappearance, which predates the disappearance of Shabani by about a year.

Episodes

See also
List of American crime podcasts

References

External links

2019 podcast debuts
Crime podcasts
Audio podcasts
American podcasts
Culture of Los Angeles